Walter R. Gooley (born April 27, 1934) is an American politician from Maine. Gooley served as a Republican State Senator from Maine's 18th District, representing part of Kennebec and Franklin Counties, including his residence in Farmington. He was first elected to the Maine State Senate in 2006 after serving for 8 years (4 terms) in the Maine House of Representatives from 1994 to 2002.

Gooley graduated from the University of Connecticut in 1957 with a B.S. in forestry and entomology.

References

1934 births
Living people
People from Farmington, Maine
Politicians from Pittsfield, Massachusetts
University of Connecticut alumni
Republican Party members of the Maine House of Representatives
Republican Party Maine state senators
21st-century American politicians